A134 may refer to:
 A134 road (England), a road connecting King's Lynn and Colchester
 Aero A.134, a prototype powered by the 130 hp Walter NZ radial piston engine of the 1930s Czechoslovakian sports and touring biplane aircraft